The Three Heroes and Five Gallants is a 2016 Chinese television series produced by Huayi Brothers with Tianxing Yiyuan Entertainment, based on the 19th-century classic novel of the same name. Starring Chen Xiao, Yan Yikuan and Zheng Shuang, the series premiered on February 17, 2016, on Anhui TV.

Cast

Chen Xiao as Bai Yutang
Yan Yikuan as Zhan Zhao
Zheng Shuang as Ding Yuehua
Liang Guanhua as Bao Zheng
Liu Dekai as Emperor Renzong of Song
Ma Shuliang as Pang Ji
Xie Ning as Xu Qing
Rao Xiaozhi as Pang Yu
Li Xinyu as Consort Pang
He Yu as Lu Fang
Wang Daqi as Han Zhang
Wang Maolei as Jiang Ping
Han Zhengguo as Gongsun Ce
Wu Jing as Sha Qiukui
Zhang Zhixi as Jin Yalan
Zhang Na as Ji Saihua
Xue Qi as Wang Chao
Diao Biao as Ma Han
Li Tianqi as Zhang Long
Zhu Jing as Zhao Hu
Guan Xin as Bao Xing
Li Tiannuo as Yan Fei
Niu Baoping as Pang Wang
Hong Bo as Deng Che
Zhang Jianli as Liu Wang

Ratings

International broadcast
China - Anhui Television (17 February 2016)
Malaysia - Astro Quan Jia HD (24 May 2016)
Hong Kong - TVB Chinese Drama (23 August 2016)
Taiwan - Long Turn TV (13 September 2016)
Canada - Talentvision (5 October 2016)

Theme songs

References

External links
 

Television shows based on The Seven Heroes and Five Gallants
Gong'an television series
Anhui Television original programming
2016 Chinese television series debuts